A Jazz Hour with Art Blakey's Jazz Messengers: Blues March is a 1995 CD release by Art Blakey & The Jazz Messengers for Movieplay records.

It is a rare session for the small Movieplay imprint featuring Jazz Messengers staple "Along Came Betty" along with three Shorter tunes, among them a less prevalent version of "Lester Left Town." The booklet that accompanies the Movieplay CD indicates only that it was recorded in Europe, in "1961" but the band's lineup, and track lengths indicate that was likely recorded December 6, 1960, at Konserthuset, Stockholm, and most of the material was previously released on the Swedish Dragon label as "Art Blakey & The Jazz Messengers – Live In Stockholm 1960."

Track listing
 "The Summit" (Shorter) — 8:41
 "Along Came Betty" (Golson) — 8:41
 "Lester Left Town" (Shorter) — 12:32
 "Blues March" (Golson) — 10:21
 "Nellie Bly" (Shorter) — 11:41
 "It's Only a Paper Moon" (Harold Arlen, E.Y. "Yip" Harburg, Billy Rose) — 11:22

Personnel

 Art Blakey - drums
 Wayne Shorter - tenor saxophone
 Lee Morgan - trumpet
 Bobby Timmons - piano
 Jymie Merritt - bass

1961 albums
Art Blakey albums